The  is a limited express train service in Japan operated by JR West which runs from  and  to .

Stops
Trains stop at the following stations:

 -  -  - -  - -  - - -  - -  - - -  - -  - - 

Stations in brackets indicate stations where not all trains stop at.

References

 JTB Timetable, March 2009 issue

Named passenger trains of Japan
West Japan Railway Company
Railway services introduced in 2001